Sun Zhili (born 1942) is a Chinese translator. He is among the first few in China who translated the works of Jane Austen's into Chinese language. His translations are well respected by domestic and overseas scholars.

Biography
Sun was born in 1942 in China. He was a professor at the PLA College of Foreign Languages (now PLA Information Engineering University). He started to publish works in 1979, after the Cultural Revolution.

Personal life
Sun married Tang Huixin, who is also an English teacher.

Translations

References

1942 births
Living people
Academic staff of PLA Information Engineering University
English–Chinese translators